Ebenezer School & Home for the Visually Impaired is a school for blind and visually disabled children in Pok Fu Lam, Hong Kong.

A German missionary, Martha Postler, created the school in 1897. The school's first location was in Western District. Postler, who originated from the Hildesheimer Blindenmission, created the school as she took care of four girls who experienced visual impairment. The school moved into its current site in 1912 and it was officially established the following year.

The school was under the supervision of Church Missionary Society during World War I while the Sisters continued to provide service.

References

1897 establishments in Hong Kong
Educational institutions established in 1897
Schools for the blind
Schools in Hong Kong
Pok Fu Lam